The Stromquist–Woodall theorem is a theorem in fair division and measure theory. Informally, it says that, for any cake, for any n people with different tastes, and for any fraction r, there exists a subset of the cake that all people value at exactly a fraction r of the total cake value.

The theorem is about a circular 1-dimensional cake (a  "pie"). Formally, it can be described as the interval [0,1] in which the two endpoints are identified. There are n continuous measures over the cake: ; each measure represents the valuations of a different person over subsets of the cake.

The theorem says that, for every weight , there is a subset , which is a union of at most  intervals, which all people value at exactly :

Proof sketch 
 be the subset of all weights for which the theorem is true. Then:

 . Proof: take  (recall that the value measures are normalized such that all partners value the entire cake as 1).
 If , then also . Proof: take . If  is a union of   intervals in a circle, then  is also a union of   intervals.
  is a closed set. This is easy to prove, since the space of unions of  intervals is a compact set under a suitable topology.
 If , then also . This is the most interesting part of the proof; see below.

From 1-4, it follows that . In other words, the theorem is valid for every possible weight.

Proof sketch for part 4 

 Assume that  is a union of  intervals and that all  partners value it as exactly .
 Define the following function on the cake, :

 

 Define the following measures on :

 

 Note that . Hence, for every partner : .
 Hence, by the Stone–Tukey theorem, there is a hyper-plane that cuts  to two half-spaces, such that:

 

Then, by the definition of the :

 

 The set  has  connected components (intervals). Hence, its image  also has  connected components (1-dimensional curves in ).
Hence, one of these must have at most  components.
 Suppose it is  that has at most  components (curves). Hence,  has at most  components (intervals).
 Hence, we can take . This proves that .

Tightness proof 
Stromquist and Woodall prove that the number  is tight if the weight  is either irrational, or rational with a reduced fraction  such that .

Proof sketch for  

 Choose  equally-spaced points along the circle; call them .
 Define  measures in the following way. Measure  is concentrated in small neighbourhoods of the following  points: . So, near each point , there is a fraction  of the measure .
 Define the -th measure as proportional to the length measure.
Hence, it must touch at least  points.
 The consensus subset must touch  points but contain at most  gaps; hence it must contain at least  intervals.

See also 

 Fair cake-cutting
 Fair pie-cutting
 Exact division
 Stone–Tukey theorem

References 

Cake-cutting
Theorems in measure theory